The Minister of Corrections in New Zealand is the cabinet member appointed by the Prime Minister to be in charge of the Department of Corrections. The current Minister of Corrections is Kelvin Davis.

Responsibilities
The Minister of Corrections is responsible for determining policy and exercising statutory powers and functions related to the Corrections portfolio. The Minister is also responsible to Parliament for ensuring the Department of Corrections carries out its functions properly and efficiently.
Legislation related to the Corrections portfolio includes the Corrections Act 2004 (and accompanying regulations in the Corrections Regulations 2005), the Criminal Justice Act 1985, the Parole Act 2002, and the Sentencing Act 2002.

The Minister of Corrections is also responsible for:
Giving general directions to the Chief Executive of the Department relating to the exercise of their powers and functions.
Any other powers and functions conferred under the Corrections Act 2004 or regulations made under it.
Setting pay rates for part-time probation officers.
Declaring land or buildings to be a prison or community work centre.
Requisitioning land and buildings in an emergency.
Approving pay rates for working prisoners.
Setting the cost of imprisonment so it can be deducted from the earnings of prisoners on "release to work".
Consenting to the Chief Executive contracting out escort and courtroom custodial services.

List of ministers
The following ministers have held the office of Minister of Corrections.

Key

References

Law enforcement in New Zealand
Corrections
Political office-holders in New Zealand